William Armstrong (14 January 1891 – 1 March 1924) was a British-American actor and comedian.

Biography
Armstrong was born on 14 January 1891 in Bristol, England.

Armstrong started his career in the British music hall tradition and appeared in roles for Fred Karno from 1910 until 1914 in his native Bristol, before heading to the US and working in films for Keystone Studios, mainly in comedy roles, where he was a regular  player in the films of Charlie Chaplin among others.

Armstrong died from tuberculosis on 1 March 1924 in Sunland, California.

Partial filmography
His New Job (1915)
The Champion (1915)
In the Park (1915)
The Tramp (1915)
By the Sea (1915)
Work (1915)
A Woman (1915)
The Bank (1915)
Shanghaied (1915)
Police (1916)
Watch Your Neighbor (1918)
Clean Sweep (1918)
Triple Trouble (1918)
Hop, the Bellhop (1919)
 Love, Honor and Behave (1920)
Skirts (1921)
When Knights Were Cold (1923)
The Extra Girl (1923)

References

External links

1891 births
1924 deaths
English male film actors
English male silent film actors
20th-century English male actors
Male actors from Bristol
20th-century deaths from tuberculosis
British expatriate male actors in the United States
Tuberculosis deaths in California